Mr. Blues Plays Lady Soul is the sixth album led by saxophonist Hank Crawford featuring performances recorded in 1969 for the Atlantic label.

Reception

AllMusic awarded the album 3 stars.

Track listing
 "Groovin'" (Eddie Brigati, Felix Cavaliere) - 2:41
 "I Can't See Myself Leaving You" (Ronnie Shannon) - 3:32
 "Never Let Me Go" (Ray Evans, Jay Livingston) - 3:28
 "Baby I Love You" (Ronnie Shannon) - 3:40
 "Lady Soul" (Hank Crawford) - 3:12
 "Soul Serenade" (Curtis Ousley, Luther Dixon) - 3:30 
 "Ain't No Way" (Carolyn Franklin) - 3:37
 "Since You've Been Gone (Sweet Sweet Baby)" (Aretha Franklin, Teddy White) - 2:16
 "Take a Look" (Clyde Otis) - 3:13
 "Going Down Slow" (James Burke Oden) - 7:26

Personnel 
Hank Crawford - alto saxophone
Bernie Glow, Joe Newman, Ernie Royal, Snooky Young - trumpet (tracks 1, 2, 4-8 & 10)
Jimmy Cleveland, Benny Powell - trombone (tracks 1-3, 7 & 8)
Frank Wess - alto saxophone (tracks 1, 2, 4-8 & 10)
David Newman - tenor saxophone, flute
Seldon Powell - tenor saxophone (tracks 1, 2, 4-8 & 10)
Pepper Adams - baritone saxophone (tracks 1, 2, 4-8 & 10)
Paul Griffin - piano, organ
Eric Gale - guitar 
Ron Carter (tracks 1, 3 & 7), Jerry Jemmott (tracks 2 & 8), Chuck Rainey (tracks 3-6 & 10) - bass
Bernard Purdie  - drums
Unidentified string section conducted by Gene Orloff (tracks 3 & 9)
Arif Mardin - arranger, conductor

References 

1969 albums
Hank Crawford albums
Atlantic Records albums
Albums produced by Joel Dorn
Albums arranged by Arif Mardin